Richard Carlin is the author of several books on folk, country, and traditional music.

Writing 
Carlin worked for Folkways Records as an independent producer from 1975 to 1980, before becoming an editor for Music at Pearson Prentice Hall. In 2008, Carlin published Worlds of Sound: The Story of Smithsonian Folkways. In 2016, he published Godfather of the Music Business, which is a biography of Morris Levy. 

Carlin lives in Glen Ridge, New Jersey.

Bibliography 

 Worlds of Sound: The Story of Smithsonian Folkways, 2008 
Godfather of the Music Business: Morris Levy, 2016

References

External links 

 Richard Carlin author page

Year of birth missing (living people)
Living people
American non-fiction writers